This is a list of newspapers published in Malaysia, sorted by language.

Published newspapers by languages

English
The Borneo Post – English daily in Sarawak and Sabah
Business Times
Daily Express – English daily in Sabah
The Edge
New Sarawak Tribune – English daily in Sarawak, re-published in 2010
New Straits Times – Malaysia's nationwide English-language tabloid newspaper
The Star – Malaysia's largest and number one nationwide English-language tabloid newspaper
The Sun – Malaysia's free nationwide English-language tabloid newspaper

Malay
Berita Harian – Malaysia's nationwide Malaysia-language tabloid newspaper
Harakah – owned by Pan-Malaysian Islamic Party (PAS)
Harian Metro – Malaysia's largest and number one nationwide Malaysia-language tabloid newspaper
Kosmo! – Malaysia's nationwide Malaysia-language tabloid newspaper
Sinar Harian – Malaysia's nationwide Malaysia-language tabloid community newspaper
Utusan Borneo – Malay daily in Sarawak and Sabah, published by The Borneo Post
Utusan Malaysia – Malaysia's nationwide Malaysia-language tabloid newspaper
Utusan Sarawak – Malay daily in Sarawak

Chinese
China Press – 中國報, Klang Valley's largest and number one nationwide Chinese-language tabloid newspaper
Guang Ming – 光明日報, wholly owned subsidiary of Sin Chew Media Corporation Bhd, Penang Island's largest and number one Penangite Chinese-language tabloid newspaper
Kwong Wah Yit Poh – 光華日報
Nanyang Siang Pau – 南洋商報, West Malaysia's largest and number one nationwide Chinese-language tabloid newspaper
Oriental Daily News – 東方日報
Overseas Chinese Daily News – 華僑日報, Chinese daily in Sabah
See Hua Daily News – 詩華日报, largest and best selling Chinese daily newspaper on the island of Borneo
Sin Chew Daily – 星洲日報, Malaysia's largest and number one nationwide Chinese-language tabloid newspaper

Indigenous
 Utusan Borneo – Iban daily in Sarawak

Tamil
Tamil Malar – 
Makkal Osai – 
Malaysia Nanban –

Arabic
Aswaq Magazine – business sectors and events; based in Selangor

Dutch
Maleisië Nieuws – aggregated news on Malaysia; based in Kuala Lumpur

Online-only newspapers
Bernama
The Malaysian Insider - ceased publications in March 2016
Malaysiakini
Malay Mail

Defunct newspapers
New Sabah Times – English, Malay, and Kadazan-Dusun daily in Sabah, ceased publication on 31 December 2020
Sarawak Tribune – suspended in 2006, but has since been relaunched as the New Sarawak Tribune in 2010.
Shin Min Daily News – Malaysia's first Chinese-language tabloid newspaper; publication ceased in 1994
Sunday Mail – replaced by the Weekend Mail
Tamil Nesan – ceased publication on 1 February 2019
Weekend Mail – successor of the Sunday Mail, but was indefinitely suspended in 2006
Utusan Melayu (Jawi script) – now a weekly newspaper and incorporating with Utusan Malaysia, ceased publication on 10 October 2019

References

Further reading
 

 
Malaysia
Newspapers